Amarna letter EA 39, titled: "Duty-Free", is a fairly short letter from the King of Alashiya (modern Cyprus). Almost half the letter, Para I, is a shortened greeting formula. The letter is requesting the Pharaoh to let messengers pass freely, as they are also being represented as merchants; this also applies to their shipping.

The Amarna letters, about 300, numbered up to EA 382, are a mid 14th century BC, about 1350 BC and 20–25 years later, correspondence. The initial corpus of letters were found at Akhenaten's city Akhetaten, in the floor of the Bureau of Correspondence of Pharaoh; others were later found, adding to the body of letters.

The letter

EA 3: "Duty-Free"
EA 38, letter number six of seven, from Alashiya. (Not a linear, line-by-line translation.)

Obverse

(Lines 1-9)–Say to the king of Egypt, my [brother]er: Message of the king of Alašiya, your brother. For me all goes well, and for you may all go well. For your household, your chief wives, your sons1 your wives, your chariots, your many horses, and in Egypt-(Mizri), your country, may all go very well.

Paragraph II

(10-13)–My brother, let my messengers go promptly and safely so that I may hear my brother's greeting.

Paragraph III

(14-20)–these men are my merchants. My brother, let them go safely and prom[pt]ly. No one making a claim in your name is to approach my merchants of my ship.2

Reverse

–(uninscribed reverse, with a single line of written ink hieratic text)–(complete EA 39, minor lacunae, lines 1-20)

See also
Amarna letters–phrases and quotations

External links
Line drawing of EA 39, Obverse & Reverse
Line Drawing, cuneiform, and Akkadian, EA 205: Obverse & Reverse, CDLI no. P270978 (Chicago Digital Library Initiative)
CDLI listing of all EA Amarna letters, 1-382

References

Moran, William L. The Amarna Letters. Johns Hopkins University Press, 1987, 1992. (softcover)

Alashiya
Amarna letters